The University of Hong Kong Faculty of Law (commonly known as HKU Law) is one of the 11 faculties and schools at the University of Hong Kong. Founded in 1969 as the Department of Law, it is the oldest law school in Hong Kong. HKU Law is consistently ranked among the top law schools in the world. In 2019, HKU Law was ranked 18th on the QS World Rankings and 22nd on the Times Higher Education World Rankings.

History
The Faculty of Law of the University of Hong Kong was established in 1969 as a Department of Law in the Faculty of Social Sciences. It became a faculty in its own right in 1984.

With the help of Henry Litton, Gerald de Basto, and other legal practitioners, the faculty has taken part in publishing the Hong Kong Law Journal since 1971 as well as the student-run law review Hong Kong Journal of Legal Studies since 1994. The faculty also has had successes in international moot court competitions, having won moots such as the Hong Kong Red Cross International Humanitarian Law Moot and LAWASIA Moot in the past.

Degrees offered
The faculty has two departments, the Department of Law and the Department of Professional Legal Education, and four research centres. The faculty offers a 4-year Bachelor of Laws program, four 5-year double-degree programs: BSocSc (Government and Laws) - LLB, BBA (Business and Laws) - LLB, BA (Literary Studies) - LLB, and BSc - LLB in conjunction with other faculties of the university, a 2-year intensive JD program (for non-law graduates), a professional qualification program (PCLL), and a variety of LLM programmes focusing on human rights, Chinese law, Compliance and Regulation, corporate law and financial law, information technology and intellectual property, and arbitration. It also offers various research postgraduate programs, including MPhil, PhD and SJD.

Six members of the faculty have been conferred the honour of Teaching Fellows by the University, rendering it one of the Departments with the largest number of Teaching Fellows in the University. The faculty also plays host to many scholars and academic conferences each year. The faculty works closely with the legal profession. Its PCLL programme provides an entry qualification to the legal profession in Hong Kong.

Notable alumni
The faculty has alumni serving in all three branches of government.

Judiciary 
Patrick Chan, former Permanent Judge of the Court of Final Appeal
Andrew Cheung, 3rd Chief Justice of the Court of Final Appeal
Susan Kwan, Vice-President of the Court of Appeal
Johnson Lam, Vice-President of the Court of Appeal
Jeremy Poon, 5th Chief Judge of the High Court of Hong Kong
Wally Yeung, Vice-President of the Court of Appeal

Executive 
David Leung SC, 6th Director of Public Prosecutions
Elsie Leung, 1st Secretary for Justice
Keith Yeung SC, 5th Director of Public Prosecutions
Rimsky Yuen SC, 3rd Secretary for Justice

Legislative 
Audrey Eu SC, former Member of the Legislative Council
Alan Leong SC, former Member of the Legislative Council
Dennis Kwok, former Member of the Legislative Council
Margaret Ng, former Member of the Legislative Council
Ronny Tong SC, Member of the Executive Council, former Member of the Legislative Council

Others:
 Johannes Chan, SC (Hon) the only Honorary Senior Counsel in Hong Kong, former Dean of the Faculty of Law

Notable professors
 Johannes Chan SC (Hon), human rights lawyer, Chairman of the Management Committee of the Consumer Legal Action Fund, and member of the Bar Council of the Hong Kong Bar Association
 Albert Chen, member of the Basic Law Committee and the Law Reform Commission of Hong Kong

Emeritus professors
 Yash Ghai, Chairman of the Constitution of Kenya Review Commission (2000–2004)
 Raymond Wacks, professor of Law and Legal Theory

Visiting professors
 Francis Reynolds, emeritus professor of law at the University of Oxford, author of Bowstead and Reynolds on Agency
 Sarah Worthington QC (Hon), professor of law at the University of Cambridge

Honorary professors
 Andrew Li, first Chief Justice of Hong Kong after the Handover
 Grenville Cross, former Director of Public Prosecutions of Hong Kong
 Michael Kirby, former Justice of the High Court of Australia

See also
The University of Hong Kong
Chinese University of Hong Kong
City University of Hong Kong
Postgraduate Certificate in Laws
The Asian Institute of International Financial Law

References

External links

Law schools in Hong Kong
University of Hong Kong